Doriot is a French surname, and may refer to:

 Auguste Doriot racing motorist, finished third in the world's first motor race Paris–Rouen 1894
 Doriot Anthony Dwyer (1922–2020), American flautist.
 Georges Doriot (1899–1987), one of the first American venture capitalists.
 Jacques Doriot (1898–1945), a French communist, later fascist
 Roger Ernest Doriot (1943- ), Civil Engineer, then evangelical Protestant missionary to Irian Jaya/Papua, Indonesia (west New Guinea), from 1975- .